The NHS App allows patients using the National Health Service in England to book appointments with their GP, order repeat prescriptions and access their GP record. Available since late 2018, the app was developed by NHS Digital and NHS England.  The Health ministers Jeremy Hunt and Matt Hancock both stressed their support for the project. Hancock presented it as the key a radical overhaul of NHS technology. Hunt claimed it would mark 'the death-knell of the 8am scramble for GP appointments that infuriates so many patients'.

It can also be used to access NHS 111, set patients' data sharing preferences, record organ donation preferences and end-of-life care preferences.  All GPs in England will be required to connect to it.

Development

Jeremy Hunt laid down eight "challenges" for the development in September 2017:
Symptom checking and triage 
Access to your medical records
GP appointment booking
Repeat prescription ordering
Changing data sharing preferences
Changing organ donation preferences
Changing end of life care choices
Promoting "approved apps" to patients

The app was piloted from October 2018 and plans were to roll it out across England in December 2018. Patients are to be sent a text message from their GP practice inviting them to download the app. It was released for testing in September 2018 in Liverpool, Staffordshire, Redditch and Bromsgrove, Wyre Forest and South Worcestershire, Wolverhampton, Hastings and Rother, and Bristol, North Somerset and Gloucestershire.  Initially, it would offer symptom checking and triage; appointment booking; repeat prescription ordering; access to patient records; national data opt-out; and organ donation preference. The launch of the app was accompanied by a decision that the name NHS Choices was to be abandoned, and in future the NHS site was to be called "the NHS website". In November 2018, it was reported that although it would be publicly available in the App Store and Google Play store, as well as a desktop webpage by the end of December, it would be made operational to patients "one STP or one CCG at a time", a process which was expected to take several months.

From 2019, it was planned to support GP video consultations and connect to an Apple Watch or FitBit. Later development includes plans to link up with the NHS e-Referral Service to allow patients to book hospital or clinic appointments.

In January 2019, it was available for downloading, but according to NHS England GP practices would need to 'review some of their system settings before they can go live'.  It was intended to be fully operational by 1 July 2019. The app uses the NHS login to verify the identity of users.

After the establishment in early 2019 of NHSX as a central IT department for the NHS, chief executive Matthew Gould stated that the app should not have any more features, but should be a platform allowing "other people innovate on top of it".

Added features 
Since 2020, facial verification can be used to authenticate new sign-ups to the app. To take advantage of this, users submit a photo from an official document such as a passport or a driving licence. The app's developers said this feature could also be used for COVID-19 "immunity passports" providing documented proof of users' immunity due to a past infection, an idea which has proved controversial.

Since 17 May 2021, the app can display COVID-19 vaccination records, initially to assist users in proving their vaccination status when travelling overseas. In the following months, this feature was given the name 'NHS COVID Pass' and began to be used by venues and businesses in England.

Statistics 
, the app had almost 5 million monthly users. In May and June 2021, over 1.2million repeat prescriptions and 100,000 GP appointments were arranged through the app. By mid-July, eight weeks after the addition of COVID-19 vaccination status, over 10 million users had registered with the app.  By June 2022 there were 28 million patients registered. In the year to  May 2022 over 16 million repeat prescriptions were ordered, 1.3 million GP appointments were booked, GP records were viewed more than 90 million times and 277,000 organ donation decisions were registered.

See also 

 NHS COVID-19 – app for infectious contact tracking and alerting

References

External links 
 

app
Health software